The Raesly House is a house in Plankinton, South Dakota. It is designed in the Queen Anne style of architecture. It was constructed c. 1883 and added to the National Register in 2004.

It was deemed notable as "a fine example of a hipped roof with lower cross gables subtype of the Queen Anne Style."

References

Houses on the National Register of Historic Places in South Dakota
Queen Anne architecture in South Dakota
Houses in Aurora County, South Dakota
National Register of Historic Places in Aurora County, South Dakota